Jalen Brown (born January 23, 1995) is an American soccer player who plays as a forward for Stumptown Athletic in the National Independent Soccer Association.

Career
Brown played fours years of college soccer at Xavier University between 2013 and 2016, where he made a total of 80 appearances and scored 14 goals.

Brown also played with USL PDL sides Cincinnati Dutch Lions and Des Moines Menace.

On January 13, 2017, Brown was selected in the second round (38th overall) of the 2017 MLS SuperDraft by New York City FC. However, he wasn't signed by the club.

Brown signed with United Soccer League club Rochester Rhinos on March 7, 2017.

Brown signed with National Premier Soccer League club New York Cosmos B on May 30, 2018.

In September 2019, Brown was signed by National Independent Soccer Association side Stumptown Athletic ahead of its inaugural season.

Personal life
Brown's sister is professional soccer player Ryanne Brown, and Philippines international Sarina Bolden is their cousin.

References

1995 births
Living people
American soccer players
Xavier Musketeers men's soccer players
Cincinnati Dutch Lions players
Des Moines Menace players
Rochester New York FC players
USL League Two players
USL Championship players
Soccer players from Indianapolis
New York City FC draft picks
New York Cosmos players
Stumptown AC players
National Premier Soccer League players
National Independent Soccer Association players
Association football forwards